"Sing" (often stylized as "SING") is My Chemical Romance's fourth track and third single from their fourth studio album, Danger Days: The True Lives of the Fabulous Killjoys. The official single artwork was posted on the band's website in October 2010. "Sing" marks the first time a song of the band has reached adult contemporary stations; it began airplay through Chicago radio station WCFS-FM by March 2011.

The song was the second-best selling rock song of 2011 in the UK, ahead of Paramore's "Monster" and behind Foo Fighters' "Rope".

Release
The song debuted on BBC Radio 1 and subsequently on the band's MySpace and several other radio stations on November 3, 2010. The song was released on iTunes the same day. The song has been described as "poppy" and with a "surprising different sound than previous MCR tracks" by Wendy Rollins of Philadelphia's Radio 104.5. Dan Martin from NME reviewed the album and said the following of the song: "Starting off synthy, slinky and just a little bit funky, 'Sing' then erupts into another euphoric call to mass doing-stuff-together as waves of filthy bass cascade around Gerard as he sings, "You've got to be what tomorrow needs" as he dodges elephant-stomp drums." Trash Hits said of the song: "This is a slower, smouldering effort which jangles in a Depeche Mode style while Gerard Way murmurs his way through."

Music video
The music video premiered on MTV.com and VH1.com and was directed by Gerard Way and Paul Brown. Picking up after the events of the "Na Na Na (Na Na Na Na Na Na Na Na Na)" music video, "Sing" opens with My Chemical Romance as their alter-egos (The Fabulous Killjoys) driving down a freeway tunnel on their Pontiac Firebird with brief "television advertisement" clips from Better Living Industries (BL/ind), running over a BL/ind security guard and a draculoid at a toll booth/checkpoint. The band arrives in the album's dystopia known as Battery City, stopping in front of BL/ind headquarters.

Upon discovery of the Killjoys' arrival, BL/ind places their guards on stand-by all around the headquarters. The Killjoys quickly shoot their way into the building, arriving in the main security center and rescue The Girl (Grace Jeanette), aka Missile Kid, who was previously kidnapped in "Na Na Na (Na Na Na Na Na Na Na Na Na)". During this time, Korse (Grant Morrison) is activated by BL/ind headquarters' head of security and accompanied by reinforcement draculoids and guards to stop the Killjoys. A gunfight between the Killjoys and Korse's minions follows in BL/ind's lobby. At one point, Party Poison (Gerard Way) kills and pulls off the mask of one of the draculoids, discovering him to be Agent Cherri Cola (Jimmy Urine), an ally of the Killjoys (who was captured by BL/ind while trying to infiltrate their headquarters, and turned into a draculoid).

This causes Party Poison to hesitate in the fight and be grabbed by Korse who grasps him by the neck and shoots him beneath his chin.  With Party Poison dead, the remaining Killjoys continue their escape. Shortly after Party Poison's death, Kobra Kid (Mikey Way) manages to wound Korse in the knee before getting shot himself by Korse's minions and is killed. At the lobby door, Fun Ghoul (Frank Iero), Jet-Star (Ray Toro) and Missile Kid decide to retreat; however after running outside, Fun Ghoul closes the building door, leaving himself inside to give his allies a better chance of escaping before getting shot twice. Outside BL/ind headquarters, Jet-Star is shot, dying on the hood of the Trans Am. Before the draculoids and BL/ind guards can get to The Girl, she is rescued by pirate radio DJ Dr. Death Defying and his crew, including Show Pony (Ricky Rebel) and DJ Hot Chimp (Kristan Morrison). They all escape in Dr. Death Defying's van, leaving behind their dead comrades whose bodies are bagged by BL/ind.

In a making-of video for "Na Na Na" and, to a lesser extent, "Sing", Gerard Way expressed that he is eager to film a third part of the Killjoy story.

As of September 2021, the song has 40 million views on YouTube.

Other versions
This song was performed on the TV series Glee in the second-season episode "Comeback", which was released as a single on iTunes in February 2011. It was then performed on The Glee Project. It charted higher than My Chemical Romance's version on the Billboard Hot 100, debuting and peaking at number 49.

It also was performed by the contestants of Team Cee Lo Green and Team Christina Aguilera during the Live Playoffs of the third season of American reality television The Voice, and by contestants of the a capella competition and American reality television show the Sing Off, season 3, episode 2.

On March 10, 2011, My Chemical Romance published a director's cut of the music video of "SING". It includes sound effects, among other additions.

On April 13, 2011, My Chemical Romance released a re-envisioned version of "Sing", entitled "Sing It for Japan", in support of those affected by the 2011 Tōhoku earthquake and tsunami.

Track listing
 All songs written by My Chemical Romance.

Charts

Weekly charts

Year-end charts

Certifications

Release history

References

2010 singles
My Chemical Romance songs
Rock ballads
Song recordings produced by Rob Cavallo
2010 songs
Songs written by Gerard Way
Songs written by Frank Iero
Songs written by Ray Toro
Songs written by Mikey Way
Reprise Records singles